Re-Animated is a remix album and second EP from horror punk musician Wednesday 13. It was released digitally on May 10, 2011. The album consists of remixes of earlier tracks which are all found on his 2008 Skeletons album. The cover art is also the same cover art used for that album but with a green tint added to Wednesday's face. Koichi Fukuda, former lead guitarist of Static-X contributed remixes on 2 of the album's tracks. All tracks from the Digital EP were re-released on the 2014 box set Dead Meat: 10 Years of Blood, Feathers & Lipstick with 5 extra remixes under the Disc title: "Re-Animated Resurrected".

Background
The album was released as a project to help donate money to the people of Japan who along with Wednesday during his 2011 reunion tour with the Murderdolls in Japan experienced first-hand the magnitude-8.9 earthquake that rocked the country. It was the fifth most powerful earthquake recorded since 1900.

For the first month of release a portion of all sales were donated to the American Red Cross who were supporting and advising the Japan Red Cross who were assisting the government in its response at the time.

Track listing

Personnel
Wednesday 13 - vocals, guitars
Nate Manor - bass
Racci Shay - drums
Jamie Hoover - piano, slide guitars

Remixers
Koichi Fukuda (Tracks 2 & 4)
Ross Smith (Tracks 1, 3 & 5)

Re-release
A physical release featuring the entire EP was released as part of Wednesday's Dead Meat: 10 Years of Blood, Feathers & Lipstick box set under the Disc title "Re-Animated Resurrected". This version featured 5 extra remixes. The track listing of the re-release is as follows:

 "All American Massacre" (Skull Soup Mix) - 3:23
 "Gimmie, Gimmie Bloodshed" (Punishment & Cookies Mix) - 3:50
 "No Rabbit In the Hat" (Shotgun Solution Mix) - 3:30
 "Put Your Death Mask On" (Meat Hooker Mix) - 2:48
 "Scream Baby Scream" (Ghost Boo-Ty Mix) - 3:12
 "Bad Things" (Suffocation Celebration Mix) - 3:39
 "Rambo (Bullets & Bloodshed Mix) - 2:43
 "I Wanna Be Cremated" (Fun In Funeral Mix) - 3:19
 "Get Your Grave On" (Abra-Cadaver Mix) - 3:54
 "Hail Ming" (Reign In Green Blood Mix) - 3:35

Trivia
The name of the EP is a reference to H.P. Lovecraft's Herbert West–Reanimator.

References

2011 EPs
Wednesday 13 albums